Amie Lynn Thomasson (born July 4, 1968) is an American philosopher, currently Professor of Philosophy at Dartmouth College. Thomasson specializes in metaphysics, philosophy of mind, phenomenology and the philosophy of art. She is the author of Fiction and Metaphysics (1999), Ordinary Objects (2007), Ontology Made Easy (2015), and Norms and Necessity (2020).

Biography
Thomasson was a visiting student at Brasenose College, Oxford (1987–1988) before obtaining her BA from Duke University in 1989, her MA in philosophy from the University of California, Irvine (UCI) in 1992 and her PhD in 1995, also from UCI. While at UCI, she studied primarily under David Woodruff Smith. She then worked as a teaching assistant at UCI (1992–1995), a visiting instructor at the University of Salzburg, Austria (1993), assistant professor of philosophy at Texas Tech University (1995–2000), and research assistant professor at the University of Hong Kong (1998–2000). In 2000 she joined the University of Miami as an assistant, then associate and ultimately, full professor. She joined the faculty at Dartmouth College in July 2017.

Selected works
Norms and Necessity, Oxford University Press, 2020.
Ontology Made Easy, Oxford University Press, 2015.
Ordinary Objects, Oxford University Press, 2007.
with David W. Smith (eds.), Phenomenology and Philosophy of Mind, Oxford University Press, 2005.
Fiction and Metaphysics, Cambridge University Press, 1999.

Notes

External links
Personal website
Philosophy department, University of Miami.

1968 births
20th-century American philosophers
21st-century American philosophers
Philosophers from Florida
American women philosophers
Analytic philosophers
Living people
Metaphysicians
Phenomenologists
Philosophers of art
Philosophers of mind
University of California, Irvine alumni
Dartmouth College faculty
20th-century American women
21st-century American women